Stade Migovéen is a football (soccer) club from Gabon based in Lambaréné in the Moyen-Ogooué Province.

The team plays in Gabon Second Division after be relegated by Gabon Championnat National D1.

Stadium
Currently the team plays at the 600 capacity Stade Jean Koumou.

League participations
Gabon Championnat National D1: 2012–2013
Gabon Second Division: ?-2012, 2013–

External links
Soccerway
augabon.com
Futbol24

References

Football clubs in Gabon